Franco Federico Llamas (Born 4 January 1990 in Formosa) is an Argentinian football striker who plays for Los Cuervos del Fin del Mundo, based in Tierra del Fuego province.

Career
He scored the first goal of the 2011–12 Copa Argentina.

References

1990 births
Living people
People from Formosa, Argentina
Argentine footballers
Association football forwards
21st-century Argentine people